The 2022 NAPA Auto Parts 150 was an ARCA Menards Series West race that was held on March 26, 2022 at Irwindale Speedway in Irwindale, California. It was contested over 153 laps on the  short track due to an overtime finish. It was the second race of the 2022 ARCA Menards Series West season. Tanner Reif of Sunrise Ford Racing would win the race, after dominating and leading every lap. It was Reif's first career win in his second start. It was also the first win for Sunrise Ford Racing since 2020. To fill out the podium, Cole Moore and Austin Herzog of Bill McAnally Racing, would finish 2nd and 3rd, respectively.

Background

Entry list 

 (R) denotes rookie driver.
 (i) denotes driver who is ineligible for series driver points.

 **Withdrew prior to the event

Practice/Qualifying

Starting Lineups

Race

Race results

References

2022 in sports in California
NAPA Auto Parts 150
2022 ARCA Menards Series West